Jannatabad-e Jangal (also Romanized as Jannatābād-e Jangal; also known as Jannatābād, Jannatābād-e Shīr Moḩammad, and Shir Moḩammad) is a village in Jangal Rural District, Jangal District, Roshtkhar County, Razavi Khorasan Province, Iran. At the 2006 census, its population was 2,504, in 563 families.

References 

Populated places in Roshtkhar County